State Route 203 (SR 203) is a  Arc shaped state highway in the southeastern part of the U.S. state of Georgia. Its routing is within portions of Pierce, Bacon, Appling, and Wayne counties. Its southern terminus is in Blackshear. It heads northwest to a point east of Alma and curves to the east to a point southwest of Jesup.

Route description
SR 203 begins at an intersection with SR 15/SR 121 in Blackshear, in Pierce County. The route heads northwest through rural areas until it enters Bacon County. It continues northwest until it has a very brief concurrency with SR 32, east of Alma. SR 203 curves to the east, and enters Appling County. There, it meets SR 32 and SR 121. Then, it continues to the east, entering Wayne County, to meet its northern terminus, an intersection with US 84/SR 38, southwest of Jesup.

SR 203 is not part of the National Highway System, a system of roadways important to the nation's economy, defense, and mobility.

Major intersections

See also

References

External links

 
 Georgia Roads (Routes 201 - 220)
 Georgia State Route 203 on State-Ends.com

203
Transportation in Pierce County, Georgia
Transportation in Bacon County, Georgia
Transportation in Appling County, Georgia
Transportation in Wayne County, Georgia